Artie Edward Romero (born in Springfield, Missouri) is an American cartoonist, animator, producer, director and publisher. He began his career in comic books at a young age in the 1970s, and now is best known for his animation work.

Early life

The first child of Wilma and Artie Thomas, he was born in 1951 in Springfield, Missouri, and named Artie Edward Thomas, Jr. His parents' tumultuous marriage produced three more sons before ending in divorce in 1962. Wilma then married Jose Santiago Romero, and Jose adopted the four boys, changing their names to Romero.

Romero decided to pursue a career as an artist while he was still in high school. His work was published in his school's literary magazine, and he became fascinated with the technical aspects of printing and publishing. In 1968 he joined the staff of Carl Gafford's New Milford, Connecticut based fanzine Minotaur as a co-editor. Romero recruited fellow student artists and writers to create a magazine, and in January, 1969, the first issue of Platinum Toad appeared. Printed on the school's duplicator, it included poems by co-editor Tom Haber, a cover by Romero, comics by George Laws and Robert Crumb (an unauthorized reprint of Crumb's "Keep On Truckin'"), a short story by Martha Ann Kennedy, and assorted artwork.

Comics and publishing

In his school years Romero published original illustrations by Frank Frazetta, Vaughn Bode, Barry Windsor-Smith and Michael William Kaluta in his comics and science fiction fanzine Realm (1969–72). He dropped out of college to help found Everyman Studios, an artists' collective. Other founding members of Everyman Studios include illustrators Rick Berry and Darrel Anderson, who later founded Braid Media Arts.

In 1974–75, Anderson and Romero were co-editors of a Colorado Springs alternative newspaper, The Everyman Flyer, which included underground comix.

From 1978 to 1981, Romero edited and published Cascade Comix Monthly, a fanzine about underground comix with news and artist interviews, including Art Spiegelman, Denis Kitchen, Dan O'Neill, Gilbert Shelton and Trina Robbins. Cascade also published original comix and art by S. Clay Wilson, Spain Rodriguez, Skip Williamson, M. K. Brown, Jay Lynch and other pioneering underground comix artists. Several full-size underground comix, tabloids and a series of 21 minicomics with color covers were published under Everyman Comics' imprint. Several of Romero's minicomics were reprinted, including their color covers, in Fantagraphics' 2010 anthology, Newave! The Underground Mini Comix of the 1980s.

Animator, producer and director

While attending college, Romero began working on animation projects such as music videos, TV commercials and movie titles. He continued to do so from 1981 through 1994 as Everyman Studios, then in 1994 he founded ARG! Cartoon Animation Studio. ARG! currently produces animation for movies, television and the Web. Romero's screen credits include digital effects animation for Johnny Mnemonic (Sony Pictures, 1995), and animated cartoon segments for a children's program, TV Planet (Rocky Mountain PBS, 1999).

Early work

In 1981, Romero's publishing company Everyman Studios expanded into commercial animation production, hiring animators William Kirk Kennedy, Jan Johnson and Roy W. Smith, and accepting a contract to produce an animated rock video for the band Gibraltar. A work print of the 5-minute film "King's Elevator" premiered at the 39th World Science Fiction Convention in Denver, and subsequently the finished video aired on the nationally syndicated TV series "America Rocks." The studio then began producing animated television and theatrical commercials under contract.

In 1983 the studio produced titles and animation for Frameline Filmworks' Lost starring Sandra Dee and Jack Elam, and 1984, Romero produced and directed a TV mini-series about video games called Video Game All Stars for the local NBC affiliate, KOAA Channels 5/30. The series included animated bumpers by Romero. In 2022, clips from the first episode of Video Game All Stars were licensed to be included in Pause and Replay, a series of films about the history of video games that is on public display in the Smithsonian Institution's National Museum of American History. 

Also in 1984, Romero produced title animation and animated bumpers for Almost Live, produced and hosted by Jeff Valdez. Everyman Studios continued to produce animation for TV commercials, movie title sequences and software throughout the 1980s and early 1990s, converting from film to digital animation production in 1991.

ARG! Cartoon Animation

In 1994 Romero rebranded Everyman Studios as ARG! Cartoon Animation in Colorado Springs, producing animation for Duracell's national sales meeting and visual effects for Sony Pictures' Johnny Mnemonic. Romero launched the ARG! website Artie.com in 1996, and it quickly became one of the most popular animation sites on the Web. The ARG! site got 1 billion hits in a 20-month period in 2005–2006.

Best known for his work on Keanu Reeves' 1995 cyberpunk feature Johnny Mnemonic, Romero has served as ARG! producer, director and animator on movie projects, TV series, music videos and thousands of animated shorts and commercials. His directorial credits include productions for MTV Networks, PBS, Kaiser Permanente, Harper Collins, AT&T, Transamerica, Safeco Insurance and others.

In addition to its commercial work, the studio recently produced a series of short whiteboard/Flash cartoons, Edward Lear's Nonsense Stories for YouTube and cable TV. Since January 2015, the studio has produced storyboards and 4K animation for TAYEKENI Productions' Adventures of Turtle Taido, a children's television series that is broadcast on Nigerian Television Authority stations. The program was nominated for Best Animation at the 2015 Abuja Film Festival, and was screened at Cannes Film Festival in 2016.

In 2017, the ARG! studio moved from Colorado Springs to Stilwell, Oklahoma. In 2018, Romero sold their original website domain Artie.com to Artie, Inc., a virtual reality startup, and relocated the official ARG! site to ArtieStick.com. Their short film for children, Taffy the Pink Hippopotamus premiered at WonderCon on April 2, 2022, and was screened at the 2022 San Diego Comic-Con in the children's film program.

Filmography

Selected bibliography

References

External links

ARG! Cartoon Animation
The Artie Show, Romero's blog with podcasts

ARG! Cartoon Animation on Facebook

1951 births
Living people
American animators
American comics artists
American animated film directors
American animated film producers